The 1940 Calgary Bronks season was the sixth season in franchise history where the team finished in 2nd place in the Western Interprovincial Football Union with a 4–4 record. The Bronks played in the WIFU Finals for the fifth consecutive year, but once again lost to the Winnipeg Blue Bombers in a two-game series by a total points score of 30–2.

Regular season

Standings

Schedule

Playoffs

Winnipeg won the total-point series by 30–2.

References

1940 in Canadian football
1940 in Canadian sports